Hexafluoroethane is the perfluorocarbon counterpart to the hydrocarbon ethane. It is a non-flammable gas negligibly soluble in water and slightly soluble in alcohol.  It is an extremely potent and long-lived greenhouse gas.

Physical properties
Hexafluoroethane's solid phase has two polymorphs. In the scientific literature, different phase transition temperatures have been stated. The latest works assign it at 103 K (−170 °C). Below 103 K it has a slightly disordered structure, and over the transition point, it has a body centered cubic structure. The critical point is at 19.89 °C (293.04 K) and 30.39 bar.

Table of densities:

Vapor density is 4.823 (air = 1), specific gravity at 21 °C is 4.773 (air = 1) and specific volume at 21 °C is 0.1748 m3/kg.

Uses
Hexafluoroethane is used as a versatile etchant in semiconductor manufacturing. It can be used for selective etching of metal silicides and oxides versus their metal substrates and also for etching of silicon dioxide over silicon. The primary aluminium and the semiconductor manufacturing industries are the major emitters of hexafluoroethane using the Hall-Héroult process.

Together with trifluoromethane it is used in refrigerants R508A (61%) and R508B (54%).

It is used as a tamponade to assist in retinal reattachment following vitreoretinal surgery.

Environmental effects

Due to the high energy of C-F bonds, hexafluorethane is nearly inert and thus acts as an extremely stable greenhouse gas, with an atmospheric lifetime of 10,000 years (other sources: 500 years).  It has a global warming potential (GWP) of 9200 and an ozone depletion potential (ODP) of 0.  Hexafluoroethane is included in the IPCC list of greenhouse gases.

Hexafluorethane did not exist in significant amounts in the environment prior to industrial-scale manufacturing. Atmospheric concentration of hexafluoroethane reached 3 pptv at the start of the 21st century.  Its absorption bands in the infrared part of the spectrum cause a radiative forcing of about 0.001 W/m2.

Health risks
Due to its high relative density, it gathers in low-lying areas, and at high concentrations it can cause asphyxiation. Other health effects are similar to tetrafluoromethane.

See also
Octafluoropropane
Tetrafluoroethene
Hexachloroethane

References

External links
Purification process of hexafluoroethane
Protocol for measurement of tetrafluoromethane and hexafluoroethane from primary aluminium production

Protocol for Measurement of Tetrafluoromethane and Hexafluoroethane Emissions from Primary Aluminum Production
Thermochemistry data table at chemnet.ru

Perfluoroalkanes
Refrigerants
Greenhouse gases